Uralskaya is the 4th station of the Yekaterinburg Metro located on the 1st line between metro stations "Mashinostroiteley" and "Dinamo."

The station was opened on December 23, 1992, as part of the second launch section of the Yekaterinburg metro "Mashinostroiteley" – "Uralskaya".

The station is located next to the railway station and the "Severny" (Northern) bus station.

It is the deepest metro station in Yekaterinburg.

Construction history
 August 28, 1980 – the first excavator bucket of earth was removed from the vertical shaft of the station's shaft at a solemn meeting – construction of the Sverdlovsk (former name of Yekaterinburg) metro had begun.
 September 1980 — tunneling operations deployed.
 December 1980 — a pile driver was assembled to accommodate a tunneling complex.
 May 1981 — shaft sinking completed.
 December 1981 — the first administrative building was built and put into operation near the station.
 July 1982 — the construction of the approach tunnel, the pumping chamber and the tunnel yard was completed, the driving of the running tunnel towards the "Mashinostroiteley" station began.
 August 1982 – construction of tunnels began on the longest stretch of the launch site between "Mashinostroiteley" and "Uralskaya" stations.
 August 1982 – a railway dead end was put into operation with railroad warehouses.
 March 1986 – at the construction of the station tunnels, the installation of a cast iron "shell" of large diameter tubing (8.5 meters) began.
 August 1986 – N. Vopilov's brigade from the "Uralskaya" station, having pierced 750 meters of the right running tunnel underground, made a connection at the intermediate shaft No. 10 (on the stretch to the "Mashinostroiteley" station).
 February 1987 – construction of the inclined escalator passage began.
 December 1987 – work began on the boring of the middle station tunnel.
 November 1988 – A. Pelinsky's team in the left running tunnel on the route between the stations "Uralskaya" and "Mashinostroiteley" were 1560 meters behind.
 February 1989 – after a connection carried out by Y. Gnidin's team in the left running tunnel between the stations "Dinamo" and "Uralskaya", a through passage of the train was provided under the ground along the entire route from the city center to the station "Prospect Kosmonavtov".
 June 1989 – sinking of the inclined course at the "Uralskaya" station completed.
 December 22, 1992 – the state commission was accepted into operation.
 December 23, 1992 – open for passengers.
 December 22, 1994 – open for passengers to the "1905 Square" station.

Lobbies and transfers
The station has one underground lobby connected to the northern end of the platform by four escalators. It was planned to build an underground passage from the lobby to the Yekaterinburg railway station building. A second exit from the station is also planned, leading to Chelyuskintsev street. Currently, there is no data on its construction.

Technical characteristics
 Station Construction – pylon deep foundation.
 Foundation depth – 42 meters.

Design
On the platform, the pylons stand on cast iron slabs. Inside the pylons (completely unique) natural rock was left. The floor of the platform is made of gray polished granite, the track walls of the station are lined with marble from the Nizhne-Tagil deposit, the pylons are made of marble from the Koelginsky deposit, the arches and other elements of the platform are decorated with slabs of serpentine, the arched frames and niches are made of metal. The chandeliers which are made of forged metal by Viktor Koscheev and manufactured at the Ural Electromechanical Plant – are suspended from the vault.

Ground public transportation
The station has exits to numerous stops (including the final ones) of all types of ground transport: Yekaterinburg buses, Yekaterinburg trolleybuses, Yekaterinburg trams and Yekaterinburg taxi routes.

Table: public transport routes (data as of May 2020)

Interesting facts
 The section "Mashinostroiteley" – "Uralskaya" is the longest in the Yekaterinburg Metro.
 "Uralskaya" station is the deepest in the Yekaterinburg Metro.
 In recent years, the lighting at the "Uralskaya" station has been replaced: initially, the light fixtures of this station had incandescent light bulbs, and now – special fluorescent light bulbs of an intricate shape.

References

Ссылки 
 «Uralskaya» station on the site «Metro World»
  «Uralskaya» station on the new site «Metro World»

Yekaterinburg Metro stations
Railway stations in Russia opened in 1992
Railway stations located underground in Russia